The Georgia Street Bridge in San Diego, California was constructed in 1907 to carry traffic, after a street car line was cut through a ridge where Georgia Street stood.  In 1914, the bridge was replaced with the current structure.

References

External links
 Georgia Street Bridge Historical Resource Technical Report
Curse of the Georgia Street Bridge
Return to glory: Georgia Street Bridge

Bridges in San Diego
Open-spandrel deck arch bridges in the United States